Thomas Penelton Dixon Jr. (March 30, 1906 – October 1982) was an American baseball catcher in the Negro leagues. He played with the Hilldale Club, Baltimore Black Sox, and Bacharach Giants from 1930 to 1936.

References

External links
 and Baseball-Reference Black Baseball stats and Seamheads

Baltimore Black Sox players
Bacharach Giants players
Hilldale Club players
1906 births
1982 deaths
Baseball players from Philadelphia
Baseball catchers
20th-century African-American sportspeople